The European Film Award for Best Supporting Actor was awarded by the European Film Academy to actors of European language films. It ran from 1988 to 1992.

Winners and nominees

Awards by Years

See also
 BAFTA Award for Best Supporting Actor
 César Award for Best Supporting Actor
 David di Donatello for Best Supporting Actor
 Goya Award for Best Supporting Actor
 Polish Academy Award for Best Supporting Actor

External links
European Film Academy archive

Film awards for supporting actor
Awards established in 1988
1988 establishments in Europe
Best Supporting Actor